Perthes is a commune in the Haute-Marne department in north-eastern France.

World War II
After the liberation of the area by Allied Forces in September 1944, engineers of the Ninth Air Force IX Engineering Command began construction of a combat Advanced Landing Ground outside of the town.  Declared operational on 9 September, the airfield was designated as "A-65", it was used by several combat units until October when the units moved forward with the advancing Allies.  Afterward, the airfield was closed.

See also
Communes of the Haute-Marne department

References

Communes of Haute-Marne